Intraocular hemorrhage is a bleeding (hemorrhage) inside the eye (oculus in Latin). The bleeding can occur from any structure of the eye where there is a presence of vasculature or blood flow. It can bleed inside the anterior chamber, vitreous cavity, retina, choroid, suprachoroidal space, or optic disc. Intraocular hemorrhage can be subdivided depending on the location of the bleed. It may be the result of physical trauma (direct injury to the eye), an uncommon side effect due to post op ocular surgery (such as cataracts) or other diseases, injuries or disorders (such as diabetes, hypertension, or shaken baby syndrome).  Severe bleeding may cause high pressures inside the eye, leading to blindness.

Types
The types of ocular hemorrhages are classified based on where the bleeding is occurring:
 Subconjunctival hemorrhage (bleeding just underneath the conjunctiva)
 Intraocular hemorrhages:
 Hyphema (in the anterior chamber)
 Suprachoroidal hemorrhage, (SCH) is a rare complication of intraocular surgery where blood from the ciliary arteries bleeds into the space between the choroid and the sclera. It is a potentially vision threatening pathology.
 In the posterior segment of eyeball:
 Vitreous hemorrhage (into the vitreous)
 Subretinal hemorrhage (under the retina) 
 Submacular hemorrhage (under the macula)

Causes
Different causes may cause bleeding in different locations. A Subconjunctival hemorrhage can often occur without any obvious cause or harm to the eye. A strong enough sneeze or cough can cause for a blood vessel in the eye to burst. Hyphema is a result of blunt or penetrating trauma to the orbit that creates an increase in intraocular pressures causing tears in the vessels of the ciliary body and iris leading to bleeding. Certain medical conditions put patients at risk of developing a Hyphema such as leukemia, hemophilia, Von Willebrand disease, sickle cell disease, and the use of anticoagulant medications. Neovascularization of the eye, often associated with diabetes mellitus, additionally puts patients at risk. People who have undergone surgery (such as cataracts)  may develop Hyphema after the surgery or intraoperatively. It does not always show up right away, it can occur up to a week after surgery. Vitreous Hemorrhage is caused by proliferative diabetic retinopathy, vitreous detachment with or without retinal breaks, and trauma. Less common causes include vascular occlusive disease, retinal arterial macroaneurysm, hemoglobinopathies, age-related macular degeneration, intraocular tumors, and others  Subretinal hemorrhage is caused by the retinal and/or choroidal circulation. Significant Subretinal Hemorrhage occurs in several conditions, but most commonly is associated with age-related macular degeneration, presumed ocular histoplasmosis, high myopia, retinal arterial macro-aneurysm, and trauma. Terson's syndrome (as a result of subarachnoid hemorrhage). Hemophilia (a severe bleeding disorder, usually hereditary). Anticoagulants and thrombolysis (medication to reduce blood clotting tendency or to disperse blood clots, respectively). The major causes of bleeding are injury diabetes mellitus hypertension.

Pathophysiology 
The Hemorrhages present differently depending on the type of hemorrhage it is. A Subconjunctival Hemorrhage is a bright red patch on the white (Sclera) of your eye. It is most commonly referred to as a burst blood vessel. There is no obvious cause behind why it happens but will appear as a red spot on the white part of the eye visible to the naked eye. Hyphema is when the blood pools up in the anterior chamber of the eye. The anterior chamber of the eye is where the iris (colored part of the eye) and the pupil are located.  Hyphema's are graded based on the degree or amount of blood covering the cornea. Once an open globe has been ruled out, the intraocular pressure should be checked and treated if greater than 21 mm Hg. All patients with hyphema require Ophthalmology consultation. Any patient with a Hyphema larger than a grade II hyphema, elevated Intraocular pressure, sickle cell disease, or any other type of disease and is unable to comply with daily ophthalmology evaluations should be admitted into the hospital. A Vitreous Hemorrhage is bleeding into the thick fluid in the center of the eye. This gel is the vitreous gel, and this gel is clear and allows for light to pass through to the retina, and the retina is the nerve fiber layer that sends images to the brain. This gel is located in the pupil which is responsible for and allows for the light to pass through the retina to send images to the brain. A Subretinal Hemorrhage is an accumulation of blood between the neurosensory retina and the Retinal Pigment Epithelium (RPE) arising from the choroidal or retinal circulation. These hemorrhages occur between the photoreceptor layer and retinal pigment epithelium (RPE). The hemorrhages are a deep red color and broader in shape with diffuse margins. These hemorrhages are commonly seen in Age Related Macular Degeneration, presumed ocular histoplasmosis, high myopia, Polypoidal Choroidal Vasculopathy (PCV), retinal macro aneurysm, and trauma. Sub-macular hemorrhages are commonly seen in choroidal neovascular membranes secondary to ARMD.Submacular Hemorrhage is an uncommon complication of choroidal or retinal vascular abnormalities, including choroidal neovascularization (CNV), polypoidal cho­roidal vasculopathy (PCV), and retinal macro aneurysm

Diagnosis
Depending on the type of Intraocular hemorrhage, there can be a few ways to diagnose it, most of which can be examined and diagnosed with a slit lamp examination. Intraocular hemorrhage is typically diagnosed with slit lamp examination. A Subconjunctival hemorrhage is diagnosed by looking at the eye as a subconjunctival hemorrhage will present as a red splotch in the white part of the eye. No other testing is required. Hyphema is diagnosed with a slit lamp examination. If the Hyphema is large enough then it will be visible on a pen light exam. Some symptoms include bleeding in the front of the eye, sensitivity to light, pain in the eye, and blurry, clouded or blocked vision. Vitreous hemorrhage may be diagnosed when symptoms such as floaters, haziness, perception of shadows, or cobwebs are presented upon examination. It is usually painless. Visual acuity may be affected variably depending upon the amount of blood in the visual axis. A patient will be diagnosed with slit lamp examination and have it confirmed by running an OCT. Subretinal hemorrhage's are diagnosed with a slit lamp examination of the anterior segment, dilated fundus examination, and intraocular pressure measurement. Optical coherence tomography (OCT), fundus fluorescein angiography (FFA), and fundus photography are all helpful to determine the location and depth of the hemorrhage. One should suspect abusive head trauma if a child less than three years shows retinal hemorrhages with an intracranial injury. Submacular hemorrhage patients often present with decreased central vision, sometimes 20/200 or worse. On a dilated Fundus examination, Submacular Hemorrhage can be observed as an elevation of the retina, which can also be associated with a hemorrhagic detachment of the retinal pigment epithelium (RPE).

Treatment
Subconjunctival Hemorrhage requires no treatment. It will resolve on its own within two weeks. Hyphema treatment begins with head elevation to about 30 degrees which includes going to sleep with the head elevated as well. An eye shield should also be placed and worn until the Hyphema has completely resolved. Vitreous Hemorrhages are treated by targeting the underlying cause, such as laser photo-coagulation for proliferative diabetic retinopathy or for retinal breaks (retinal detachments). Occasionally, a hemorrhage does not resolve on its own and vitrectomy surgery then becomes necessary and beneficial to aide in resolving the hemorrhage.

Subretinal Hemorrhage's do not always require immediate action, but rather can be observed and monitored. It requires follow up visits to evaluate it's progression in size and number. Hemorrhages that do not obscure or threaten vision do not warrant immediate treatment, and the primary  disorder behind the hemorrhages needs to be addressed and diagnosed. Direct intervention for retinal hemorrhages is indicated in certain hemorrhages due to their potential to damage vision with no possibility of recovery. Submacular Hemorrhage's and how much of the vision can actually be recovered with treatment depends on two things; the severity of the injury and the pre-existing macular function. Damage to the retina can occur as early as 24 hours. Overall, the window of opportunity for successful recovery is thought to be within the first two weeks of onset.

Prognosis 
The prognosis of various types of an intraocular hemorrhage depends on the location of the bleed, amount of bleeding, the severity of the condition, the rate of clearing of blood, whether the blood is obscuring the visual acuity or not, associated complications along with the hemorrhage (corneal staining,retinal detachment, pre-retinal fibrosis, ischemic optic atrophy, glaucoma) and severity of involvement of the macular region. Subconjunctival Hemorrhage will resolve on its own within 2 week. Hyphema has a relatively good prognosis. Most patients will fully recover without any deficits, however, complications are more likely in those with other comorbidities such as sickle cell disease or other diseases that lead to an increase in size of Hyphema. Vitreous Hemorrhages normally need no treatment. The blood should clear by itself and your vision will be restored. Unfortunately, this may take up to several months. Your eye doctor will follow up with you and monitor this condition until it goes away. If your case is more severe or does not clear up as expected, your eye doctor may perform a vitrectomy surgery. This removes the vitreous and replaces it with a saltwater solution similar to your eye’s natural fluids. Subretinal Hemorrhage secondary to age-related macular degeneration (AMD) has a poor visual prognosis. Having surgery to drain  the blood will only improve visual acuity in selected patients. Submacular Hemorrhage patients with an otherwise healthy retinal pigment epithelium and photoreceptors will recover the most visual function. The prognosis is often poor in cases of advanced AMD due to underlying RPE disease, despite successful clearing and removal of the hemorrhage. If left untreated, the patient will be left with a poor visual prognosis.

Epidemiology 

 Traumatic eye injury can cause Intraocular hemorrhage and can affect the normal blood vessels and can rupture them causing ocular bleeding. This can happen to anyone, at any age, with no preference of gender. With that being said, injuries tend to be more common in young males due to more outdoor activities and heavy work. Traumatic injury is more common in children during the summer as a result of them being outdoors more or being on vacation. 
 The incidence of traumatic Hyphema is approximately 12 injuries per 100,000 population. Males are three to five times more affected than females. The incidence of traumatic hyphema in children is around 70%, with 10–20 years of children being more affected. 
 Vitreous Hemorrhage is 7 cases per 1,000,000 population each year. In the Chinese population, it occurs at a much higher rate of 4.8 cases per 10,000 person-years.The incidence was found to be more with age (mainly 40 to 59 years), male gender, and use of anticoagulants. 
 Subretinal Hemorrhage The prevalence of retinal hemorrhages in adults is most commonly seen after 40 years of age, as most systemic disorders are common in that age. Retinal hemorrhages were seen in 30% of physically abused children, and most are less than six months of age. Birth-related retinal hemorrhages are seen in 25% of newborns with normal delivery and 40% to 50% of newborns with instrumental deliveries. 
 Submacular Hemorrhage typically occurs in elderly patients with exudative age-related macular degeneration, macroaneurysms or polypoidal choroidal vasculopathy, and in all populations in cases of trauma.

Research 
Research has been done on the link between intraocular hemorrhages and medication that can cause a hemorrhage. Research was completed based on the link between emorrhages and warfarin and new oral anticoagulants. 80 cases of intraocular hemorrhage (vitreous, choroidal, or retinal) were identified with warfarin in the World Health Organizations’s Vigibase database from 1968–2015. There were a total of 156 cases where there was a report of intraocular hemorrhage with new oral anticoagulants (82 cases with rivaroxaban, 65 with dabigatran, and 9 with apixaban). Warfarin had the highest report of  suprachoroidal hemorrhage. Rivaroxaban and Dabigatran had the highest reports of both retinal and vitreous hemorrhage. Apixaban also has a high report of retinal and vitreous hemorrhage but the number of cases reported were too small to make a meaningful impact. The results of the demonstrated a larger proportion of intraocular hemorrhage linked to warfarin and new oral anticoagulants compared with other drugs in the World Health Organization's database. Warfarin's report of high choroidal hemorrhage is likely due to warfarin’s long term use in a patient, hence why there is a vast number of patient's who are likely to report hemorrhage incidents when taking the medication Rivaroxaban with retinal and vitreous hemorrhage had a high number of reports by patient's taking this medication despite the fact that it became FDA-approved a year later than Dabigatran. As a result, this suggests that there is a higher risk of retinal and vitreous hemorrhage in patient's on rivaroxaban compared to patients taking Dabigatran. Apixaban had the least association with either condition which is most likely due to a small number of reported cases. This may be due to Apixaban being the most recentt of the drug class to be approved by the FDA (as of 2012).

Research in regards to hemorrhages and abused infants who suffered a form of trauma that can lead to things such as subconjunctival hemorrhage or vitreous hemorrhages. It was found that abused infants with intracranial injuries usually present with abnormal central nervous system signs, intracranial hemorrhage, and intraocular hemorrhage. Several studies have found that the incidence of child abuse is inaccurate due to the lack of complete and proper investigation of childhood fatalities as well as poor reporting to state agencies. Optic nerve sheath hemorrhage, was present in all 13 infants with non-accidental intracranial injury and multilayered retinal hemorrhage was present in at least one eye of 11 of these 13 infants.

Hyphema is a complication that can occur after glaucoma filtering surgery, although the causes are not always well known. In some cases abnormal vessels have been detected at the internal margin of the trabeculectomy opening and they are assumed to be the cause of the hemorrhage. The goal behind glaucoma surgery is to preserve vision and to avoid the progression of the glaucoma and the functional damages with  minimal side effects.

References

External links 

Medical emergencies
Eye diseases
Injuries of head